The 2009 Mosconi Cup, the 16th edition of the annual nine-ball pool competition between teams representing Europe and the United States, took place 10–13 December 2009 at the MGM Grand in Las Vegas, Nevada.

Team USA won the Mosconi Cup by defeating Team Europe 11–7.

Format
The format was broadly similar to that used in past years. However, several changes were made for this season:
 No pairing in the doubles matches can be repeated.
 Several match groupings were arranged so that every player is required to play in one and only one of the group.
 In two singles matches – the last match on Thursday, and the first on Friday – each player was selected by the opposing team captain.

Teams

Results

Thursday, 10 December

Friday, 11 December

Saturday, 12 December

Sunday, 13 December

References

External links
 Official homepage
 

2009
2009 in cue sports
2009 in sports in Nevada
Sports competitions in Las Vegas
December 2009 sports events in the United States
MGM Grand Las Vegas